Don or Donald Phillips is the name of:

 Donald Phillips (bishop) (died 2003), Canadian Anglican bishop
 Donald M. Phillips (1929–2016), Canadian politician
 Donald T. Phillips (born 1952), nonfiction writer
 Donald "Curly" Phillips (1884–1945), Canadian guide, outfitter, entrepreneur, and explorer
 Don Phillips (casting director) (1940–2021), American casting director and film producer
 Don Phillips (politician) (born 1951), American politician
 Don L. Phillips, American football and basketball coach

See also 
 Dom Phillips (1964–2022), British journalist